The 1972–73 Boston Bruins season was the Bruins' 49th season in the NHL.

Offseason

Regular season

Divisional standings

Schedule and results

Playoffs

Quarterfinals: (E2) Boston Bruins vs. (E3) New York Rangers

Player statistics

Regular season
Scoring

Goaltending

Playoffs
Scoring

Goaltending

Awards and records
Phil Esposito, Runner up, Hart Trophy

Records

Milestones

Transactions

Trades

Free agents

Claimed from waivers

Draft picks

See also
1972–73 NHL season

Farm teams

References

 Bruins on Hockey Database

Boston Bruins seasons
Boston Bruins
Boston Bruins
Boston Bruins
Boston Bruins
Bruins
Bruins